Ziminella vrijenhoeki is a species of sea slug in the family Paracoryphellidae. It was discovered at Monterey Canyon by MBARI researchers near a whale carcass 1000 meters below the surface, and was named after Robert Vrijenhoek, a MBARI evolutionary biologist. It is bright orange, and grows about 20 millimeters long.

References

Paracoryphellidae
Gastropods described in 2018
Molluscs of the Pacific Ocean